Behaimia is a genus of legume in the family Fabaceae. It is only found in Cuba. It can be distinguished from related genera, Cyclolobium and Limadendron by:
pinnately multifoliolate (vs. unifoliolate) leaves, a sessile (vs. stipitate) ovary, and an indehiscent or late dehiscent one-seeded pod.

Species
Behaimia comprises the following species:
 Behaimia cubensis Griseb.—ciruelillo, guayacan blanco, guayacancillo

Species names with uncertain taxonomic status
The status of the following species is unresolved:
 Behaimia roigii Borhidi

References

Brongniartieae
Taxonomy articles created by Polbot
Fabaceae genera